This article stated the results of the World Soling Championships from 1980 till 1984. Unfortunately not all crew names are documented in the major sources: United States Soling Association (USSA) bulletin "Leading Edge" and International Soling Association (ISA) magazine "Soling Sailing".

1980 Final results 

 1980 Progress

1981 Final results 
Only top 20 teams are documented.

 
 1981 Progress

1982 Final results 

 1982 Progress

1983 Final results 

 1983 Progress

1984 Final results 

 1984 Progress

Further results
For further results see:
 Soling World Championship results (1969–1979)
 Soling World Championship results (1980–1984)
 Soling World Championship results (1985–1989)
 Soling World Championship results (1990–1994)
 Soling World Championship results (2000–2009)
 Soling World Championship results (2010–2019)
 Soling World Championship results (2020–2029)

References

Soling World Championships